Bilal Ag Acherif (born 1977 in Kidal Region, Mali, last name alternatively spelled Cherif) is the Secretary-General of the National Movement for the Liberation of Azawad (MNLA) and president of a briefly independent Azawad.

In 1993, he left Mali for Libya to study political science and later returned in 2010.

On 26 June 2012, he was wounded in clashes between MNLA fighters and the Islamist Movement for Oneness and Jihad in West Africa during the northern Mali conflict. According to an MNLA spokesperson, he was taken to Burkina Faso for medical care.

In 2014, Bilal Ag Acherif took over the Coordination of Azawad Movements (CMA)'s presidency, until being succeeded by Alghabass Ag Intalla on December 16, 2016.

References

1977 births
Berber Malians
Living people
Tuareg people
People from Kidal Region
Members of the National Movement for the Liberation of Azawad
Heads of state of former unrecognized countries
21st-century Malian people